Yashma Tretiy is a village in Sumqayit, Azerbaijan.

References 

Populated places in Sumgait